Blade: Trinity is a 2004 American superhero film written and directed by David S. Goyer, who also wrote the screenplays to Blade and Blade II. It stars Wesley Snipes as Blade, based on the Marvel Comics character of the same name, who also produced with Goyer, Peter Frankfurt and Lynn Harris, with a supporting cast of Ryan Reynolds, Jessica Biel, Kris Kristofferson, Dominic Purcell, Parker Posey and Triple H in his acting debut.

The third and final installment in the Blade trilogy, the war between humans and vampires continues. Blade has been framed for numerous murders by the vampire leader Danica Talos, who is determined to lead her bloodthirsty compatriots to victory. Blade must team up with a band of rogue vampire hunters to save humanity from his most challenging enemy yet: Dracula.

Blade: Trinity was released in the United States on December 8, 2004. The film grossed $132 million at the box office worldwide on a budget of $65 million and received mostly negative reviews from critics for its formulaic themes, directing and acting; it is the worst-reviewed film in the trilogy. The film was followed by 2006's Blade: The Series, and also marks Reynolds' first superhero role, as well as his first collaboration with Marvel Entertainment. Marvel regained the film rights to the character in 2012.

Plot
A small group of vampires investigate an ancient tomb in the Syrian Desert, which they believe belongs to the first vampire Dracula, also called "Drake". To keep Blade from interfering, they frame him for the murder of a human familiar. FBI agents subsequently locate Blade's hideout and kill his mentor and friend, Abraham Whistler. Demoralized, Blade surrenders and is arrested.

The vampires' familiars have arranged for the authorities to turn Blade over to them. He is rescued by Hannibal King and Abigail Whistler, Abraham's daughter, who invite Blade to join their band of vampire hunters, the Nightstalkers. From them, Blade learns that Danica Talos, an old enemy of King, has revived Drake with the goal of using his powers to cure vampires of their weaknesses. As the first of the vampires, Drake is able to survive in sunlight. Along with newly-innovative ultraviolet "Sun dog" ammunition, the Nightstalkers have created an experimental bioweapon known as Daystar, capable of killing vampires at the genetic level. However, they need a purer blood source to make it effective. As Drake is too powerful to kill via normal means, they hope that the virus will kill him and, with his blood in the mix, ensure the rest of the species is wiped out; but also fear that this will include Blade.

Eager to test Blade, Drake isolates him from the Nightstalkers. He explains his view that all humans and vampires are inferior in his eyes and that he intends to wipe them from the Earth. Abigail finds evidence of the vampires' plans for human subjugation, a network of "blood farms" where brain dead humans are drained of their blood for vampire consumption. Blade deactivates the farm's life support systems and executes the familiar who had been rounding up homeless humans for the vampires.

Returning to the Nightstalkers' hideout, Abigail and Blade find all of them dead except for King and Sommerfield's daughter Zoe, both of whom have been taken captive. A recording left by Sommerfield, Daystar's creator, reveals that Drake's blood is all that is needed to make it complete and effective. King is tortured by the vampires for information, but refuses to talk, even when they threaten to turn him and force him to feed from Zoe's blood.

Blade and Abigail arrive and free the captives. Drake eventually bests Blade in combat and prepares to kill him with his own sword. Abigail fires the Daystar arrow, but Drake catches it before it strikes him. He drops it to the floor by Blade, not realizing the danger it poses to him. Abigail shoots Drake with another arrow, this time wounding him. Blade uses the distraction to stab Drake with the Daystar arrow, triggering a chemical reaction that completes the "Daystar" virus, releasing it into the air. The virus becomes airborne, killing Danica and the rest of the vampires. As Drake slowly succumbs to his wounds and the virus, he praises Blade for fighting honorably, but warns him that he will eventually succumb to his need for blood, thus proving that Blade is the future of the vampire race.

Using the last of his power, Drake shapeshifts into Blade. The FBI recover the body, but as they begin the autopsy, it transforms back into the deceased Drake. King narrates that Drake's final transformation was a gift so that Blade could escape, leaving Blade free to continue fighting his never-ending war against the forces of evil.

Alternate endings
In the unrated extended edition, the body in the morgue does not transform back into Drake. "Blade" awakens as the autopsy begins and attacks the doctors and FBI agents present. The scene ends as he menacingly approaches a cowering orderly. King narrates that the virus did not kill Blade as the human half of his heart did not stop beating, it only slowed down, causing him to enter into a comatose state until his body was ready to fight again.

In another alternate ending, the Nightstalkers reappear six months later, having tracked a werewolf to a casino in Asia.

Cast

 Wesley Snipes as Eric Brooks / Blade
 Jessica Biel as Abigail Whistler
 Ryan Reynolds as Hannibal King
 Dominic Purcell as Dracula / Drake
 Kris Kristofferson as Abraham Whistler
 Parker Posey as Danica Talos
 Callum Keith Rennie as Asher Talos
 Triple H as Jarko Grimwood
 Natasha Lyonne as Sommerfield
 Haili Page as Zoe
 Mark Berry as Chief Martin Vreede
 John Michael Higgins as Dr. Edgar Vance
 Patton Oswalt as Hedges
 James Remar as FBI Agent Ray Cumberland
 Michael Anthony Rawlins as FBI Agent Wilson Hale
 Christopher Heyerdahl as Caulder
 Scott Heindl as Gedge
 Cascy Beddow as "Flick"
 Paul Anthony as Wolfe
 John Ashker as Campbell
 Eric Bogosian as Bentley Tittle
 Ron Selmour as Dex
 Françoise Yip as Virago
 Kett Turton as "Dingo"
 Michel Cook as SWAT Member

Production

Development
In 2001, before the release of Blade II, New Line made a deal with David S. Goyer to write and produce a third Blade film. In 2002, German director Oliver Hirschbiegel was in talks to direct the film, but chose instead to direct a film about Adolf Hitler called Downfall. Goyer is friends with both Stephen Norrington and Guillermo Del Toro and asked for their advice. Del Toro did conceptual art work for the film, and was thanked in the end credits.

In August 2003, Ryan Reynolds was in negotiations to join the film and Ashley Scott was also being considered as his counterpart, and that they would also star in a potential spin-off film. Later that month, Jessica Biel signed on to the project. Producers at New Line suggested casting wrestler Triple H and Goyer was highly skeptical. Goyer was impressed by Triple H's comic timing and self deprecation, and ended up expanding his role.

Apple did not pay for product placement. They made the equipment available and included the option to buy it at a 60% reduction.

Production troubles
Reportedly, Wesley Snipes was unhappy with the film's script and original choice of director. David S. Goyer, who had written all three films in the franchise, was then selected to replace the director of the film, which Snipes also protested. Snipes reportedly caused difficulty during filming, including frequently refusing to shoot scenes, often forcing director Goyer to use stand-ins and computer effects to add his character to scenes. Goyer described making the film as "the most personally and professionally difficult and painful thing I've ever been through". Co-star Patton Oswalt alleged that Snipes would spend much of his time smoking marijuana in his trailer, and that he became violent with Goyer after accusing him of racism. It has also been alleged that Snipes refused to interact with Goyer or his co-stars, and would instead communicate with them through his assistant or the use of notes. Snipes also allegedly referred to co-star Ryan Reynolds as a "cracker" on one or more occasions.
Snipes denied that version of events and said that as an executive producer on the film he had the authority to make decisions but that some people had difficulty accepting that.

Language 
In the DVD special features, Goyer talks about how cities are often multilingual. Goyer used Esperanto and its flag as part of the fictional city where Blade is set.
The Esperanto flag is shown twice, at the entrance to the Police headquarters after Blade is rescued from jail, and in the rooftop scene where Drake threatens to drop a baby over the edge. Background elements such as signs and advertisements include Esperanto translations.
Hannibal King is at one point seen watching the William Shatner-starring Esperanto language film Incubus on television; one reviewer remarked that it was "an unintentionally apt reference" considering first-time director "Goyer's grasp of directorial fundamentals (such as when to tilt the camera and when to shoot in close-up) is about as strong as Shatner's fluency in Esperanto". The film's director of photography, Gabriel Beristain, makes a cameo appearance as the one-eyed newspaper vendor who talks to Whistler in Esperanto and discusses the public perception that Blade is a menace to society.

Music

A soundtrack containing hip hop music and electronic music was released on November 23, 2004 by New Line Records. It peaked at #68 on the Top R&B/Hip-Hop Albums and #15 on the Top Soundtracks.

Lawsuits
In 2005, Snipes sued New Line Cinema and Goyer, claiming that the studio did not pay his full salary, that he was intentionally cut out of casting decisions and the filmmaking process, despite being one of the producers, and that his character's screen time was reduced in favor of co-stars Ryan Reynolds and Jessica Biel.
In 2006, Snipes was sued by United Talent Agency for allegedly failing to fulfill agreements to pay commission to the agency on his earnings.

Reception

Box office
The film's American box office gross was $52 million, and the total worldwide gross was $132 million. This matched the first Blades take but came behind Blade II, which had grossed $150 million worldwide.

Critical response
The website's consensus reads: "Louder, campier, and more incoherent than its predecessors, Blade: Trinity seems content to emphasize style over substance and rehash familiar themes". On Metacritic the film has a score of 38% based on reviews from 30 critics, indicating "generally unfavorable reviews". Rotten Tomatoes included the film at 76 out of 94 on a countdown (from 94 to 1) of "worst to best" comic book to film adaptations. Audiences polled by CinemaScore gave the film an average grade of "B+" on an A+ to F scale.

Roger Ebert, who gave Blade three stars out of four and Blade II three and a half stars, gave Blade: Trinity one and a half stars, writing: "It lacks the sharp narrative line and crisp comic-book clarity of the earlier films, and descends too easily into shapeless fight scenes that are chopped into so many cuts that they lack all form or rhythm". James Berardinelli also rated the film one and a half stars out of four: "Blade: Trinity is a carbon copy of its predecessors. It's all kick-ass attitude and style without any substance to back it up. Yet, where the first two Blades satisfied on a visceral level, this one doesn't".

Later David S. Goyer was very critical about the final product: “I don’t think anyone involved in that film had a good experience on that film, certainly I didn’t. I don’t think anybody involved with that film is happy with the results. It was a very tortured production.”

Future

Cancelled spin-offs
In October 2008, Blade director Stephen Norrington was developing a prequel trilogy to Blade, featuring Stephen Dorff reprising his role as Deacon Frost. In 2016, Underworld actress Kate Beckinsale stated that a crossover sequel to Blade: Trinity with the Underworld film series had been in development but was cancelled after the film rights reverted to Marvel Studios in 2012.

Marvel Cinematic Universe

In May 2013, Marvel had a working script for a new Blade film. Snipes said in July 2015 that he had discussions with Marvel to reprise the role.

In July 2019, at the San Diego Comic-Con, Marvel Studios announced Blade reboot set into the Marvel Cinematic Universe, with Mahershala Ali cast as the title character. Producer Kevin Feige said that the Blade reboot was planned to be part of Marvel's Phase Five slate of films, and said that the reboot would be rated PG-13 instead of an R-rating. In February 2021, Stacy Osei-Kuffour was hired to write the script.

Video game
A tie-in Java mobile game developed by Mforma was released. Gamespot rated it 7.1 out of 10, and IGN gave it 7.7 out of 10.

See also

 Vampire films

References

External links

 
 
 
 
 
 Blade: Trinity at Marvel.com
 Blade: Trinity script at HorrorLair

2004 films
2004 horror films
2004 science fiction action films
2000s science fiction horror films
2000s monster movies
2000s superhero films
American action horror films
American neo-noir films
American science fiction action films
American science fiction horror films
American sequel films
American superhero films
Biological weapons in popular culture
Blade (comics) films
Blade (franchise)
Dracula films
2000s English-language films
Esperanto-language films
Films directed by David S. Goyer
Films produced by Peter Frankfurt
Films produced by David S. Goyer
Films produced by Wesley Snipes
Films scored by Ramin Djawadi
Films scored by RZA
Films with screenplays by David S. Goyer
Films set in 2004
Films shot in Vancouver
Kung fu films
New Line Cinema films
Martial arts horror films
Martial arts science fiction films
Superhero horror films
2000s American films
Live-action films based on Marvel Comics